Ovation is a Russian national music award in the field of entertainment and popular music. Along with MTV Russia Music Awards, it is one of the major mainstream music awards in Russia, with other awards in the Russian entertainment industry, such as Nika Award and Golden Eagle Award.

The first Ovation ceremony was held in 1992, initiated by businessman Grigory Kuznetsov. The awards can be compared to American Grammy Awards and British Brit Awards.

The award has been held every year with the exception of 1993 and 2003 to 2007. Between 2009 and 2012 as well, the award was not held, even though it indicated that the award is not discontinued.

The award ceremony, its trophy depicting a pair of applauding hands, is held annually in the "Russia" concert hall or in the State Kremlin Palace. Originally the audience was supposed to determine the winners: any person could buy a special card, fill it in and send it to the organizers. However, this method was used to identify the winners only at the first ceremony in 1992. In all subsequent "Ovation" events winners were determined by a special jury, the Higher Academic Commission, consisting of show business figures, journalists, and various artists.

"Ovation" trophies are awarded in several dozen categories, including "Soloist of the Year", "Composer of the Year", "Best Rhythm and blues Album", "Best Vocal Debut of the Year", etc. Additionally, there are various special prizes, such as "Living Legend" or the award for a major contribution to the development of the national culture.

Living Legend Award
 1994 — Alla Pugacheva
 1995 — Joseph Kobzon
 1996 — Edita Piekha
 1998 — Makhmud Esambayev
 1999 — Valery Leontiev
 2000 — Yuri Antonov
 2001 — Igor Moiseyev
 2002 — Aleksandra Pakhmutova
 2003-2007 was not awarded
 2008 — Mstislav Rostropovich, Muslim Magomayev, 
 2008-2016 was not awarded

References

External links

Official website

Russian music awards